The football tournament at the 1938 Central American and Caribbean Games was held in Panama City from 10 to 23 February.

The gold medal was won by Mexico for the second time, who earned 9 points.

Squads

Table
2 points system used.

Results

Abandoned at 1–2 in 69' when Colombia walked off because of a penalty award against them; Alejandro Morera scored for Costa Rica against an empty goal, but result counted as 1–2.

Statistics

Goalscorers

References

External links
 

1938 Central American and Caribbean Games
1938